Table Rock State Park is a  park at the edge of the Blue Ridge Mountains in northern Pickens County, South Carolina.  The park includes Pinnacle Mountain, the tallest mountain totally within the state.

Park Features
The park features a lodge built by the Civilian Conservation Corps (CCC) that includes a kitchen and a 72-seat dining room. There are two park lakes that accommodate seasonal swimming and hiking trails that lead to Mill Creek Falls, the Pinnacle Mountain summit (two routes), and Table Rock summit. A nature center offers educational programs, and there are picnic shelters and a playground.

Trails
The  Carrick Creek Nature Trail loops around two creeks with small cascades and waterfalls and displays wildflowers in season.

The trail ends at an overlook with a view of Table Rock Reservoir and Caesars Head.

The park is the eastern trailhead of the  Foothills Trail through the Blue Ridge Escarpment.

History
Prior to the signing of the Hopewell Treaty of 1785, the land now encompassed by Table Rock State Park was part of the Lower Cherokee Nation.  The Cherokee called the area, "Sah-ka-na-ga," the Great Blue Hills of God, and they established many hunting camps in the area. According to folklore, Table Rock Mountain received its name from a Cherokee legend in which the flat-topped mountain served as a table from which the Great Spirit ate his meals.

Europeans moved into the Oolenoy River Valley soon after the signing of the Hopewell Treaty, settling at Pumpkintown—named for the unusually large pumpkins grown there.  William Sutherland and James Keith operated a wayside lodge for visitors and in 1845, they built the twenty-room Table Rock Hotel, which prospered until the Civil War.  Visitors increased again after Reconstruction, and Stephen Keith reopened the Table Rock Hotel. In 1899, Keith's family built a new hotel on a new location on the mountain but by 1912 had abandoned it.

Table Rock State Park Historic District

The park was created in the 1930s, first by two companies of World War I veterans employed by the Civilian Conservation Corps. The veterans were apparently too old for the strenuous labor necessary to build a dam and otherwise work in mountainous terrain, and in 1936, they were replaced by two junior CCC companies. One of these two companies (5466) constructed a concrete dam and spillway to create the twenty-three acre Pinnacle Lake. The other (5465) built miles of trails, roads, a bathhouse, a concessions building, fish-rearing pools, eight cabins, picnic shelters, and houses for the park superintendent and warden. Most notable was a lodge constructed of logs, an L-shaped building with a great hall on the main level and a dining hall, sun porch, and kitchen on the basement level. The CCC also landscaped the park using natural vegetation from the Pinnacle Lake bed. The park opened to the public with a ceremony on April 4, 1938.

The Table Rock State Park Historic District is listed on the National Register of Historic Places in 1989. Also listed in 1989 were the related Civilian Conservation Corps Quarry No. 1 and Truck Trail, Civilian Conservation Corps Quarry No. 2, Roper House Complex and Table Rock Civilian Conservation Corps Camp Site. It is also a South Carolina Heritage Trust Site.

References

External links
 
 
 Table Rock State Park - official site

State parks of South Carolina
State parks of the Appalachians
Civilian Conservation Corps in South Carolina
Protected areas of Pickens County, South Carolina
Nature centers in South Carolina
National Register of Historic Places in Pickens County, South Carolina
Pickens, South Carolina
Historic districts on the National Register of Historic Places in South Carolina